Sara Mathilde Øster (born 21 September 1973 in Copenhagen) is a Danish artist.

Sara Mathilde Øster graduated from the University of the Arts London and debuted at Charlottenborg Spring Exhibition in 2009. She has among other places had exhibitions at Fuglsanghus, Hørsholm, and Cobra-rummet at Sophienholm.

She has undertaken two major public commissions, LuxLapis for Gladsaxe Gymnasium (2011) and SolarisMontium for Kastanjehaven nursing home, Frederiksberg.

Sara Mathilde Øster is featured in the book 101 Artists (2011) by Tom Jørgensen

References 

Danish contemporary artists
Danish women artists
Artists from Copenhagen
Alumni of the University of the Arts London
20th-century Danish people
21st-century Danish people
1973 births
Living people